Mount Hagen District is a district of the Western Highlands Province of Papua New Guinea. Its capital is Mount Hagen.

At the 2000 census, the population of the district was 86,517 (44,460 males, 42,057 females in 19,214 households):
 Subdistrict Mt. Hagen Rural: 58,735 (29,513 m, 29,222 f in 13,762 households)
 Subdistrict Mt. Hagen Urban: 27,782 (14,947 m, 12,835 f in 5,452 households)

References

Districts of Papua New Guinea
Western Highlands Province